South Gifford is a village in Macon County, Missouri, United States. The population was 22 at the 2020 census.

History
South Gifford had its start in the early 1900s when the railroad was extended to that point. A post office called South Gifford was established in 1913, and remained in operation until 1971.

Geography
South Gifford is located at  (40.025177, -92.682154).

Demographics

2010 census
As of the census of 2010, there were 50 people, 19 households, and 13 families living in the village. The racial makeup of the village was 98.0% White and 2.0% from two or more races.

There were 19 households, of which 31.6% had children under the age of 18 living with them, 63.2% were married couples living together, 5.3% had a female householder with no husband present, and 31.6% were non-families. 15.8% of all households were made up of individuals. The average household size was 2.63 and the average family size was 3.08.

The median age in the village was 39.5 years. 26% of residents were under the age of 18; 10% were between the ages of 18 and 24; 20% were from 25 to 44; 44% were from 45 to 64; and 0.0% were 65 years of age or older. The gender makeup of the village was 54.0% male and 46.0% female.

2000 census
As of the census of 2000, there were 72 people, 24 households, and 19 families living in the village. The population density was 345.2 people per square mile (132.4/km). There were 31 housing units at an average density of 148.6/sq mi (57.0/km). The racial makeup of the village was 100.00% White.

There were 24 households, out of which 45.8% had children under the age of 18 living with them, 54.2% were married couples living together, 12.5% had a female householder with no husband present, and 20.8% were non-families. 16.7% of all households were made up of individuals, and none had someone living alone who was 65 years of age or older. The average household size was 3.00 and the average family size was 3.16.

In the village, the population was spread out, with 37.5% under the age of 18, 6.9% from 18 to 24, 40.3% from 25 to 44, 11.1% from 45 to 64, and 4.2% who were 65 years of age or older. The median age was 26 years. For every 100 females, there were 118.2 males. For every 100 females age 18 and over, there were 114.3 males.

The median income for a household in the village was $22,500, and the median income for a family was $17,917. Males had a median income of $15,833 versus $14,583 for females. The per capita income for the village was $9,225. There were 31.6% of families and 28.1% of the population living below the poverty line, including 28.6% of under eighteens and none of those over 64.

References

Cities in Macon County, Missouri
Cities in Missouri